
Gmina Pakość is an urban-rural gmina (administrative district) in Inowrocław County, Kuyavian-Pomeranian Voivodeship, in north-central Poland.

Villages
Apart from the town of Pakość, Gmina Pakość contains the villages and settlements of Dziarnowo, Giebnia, Gorzany, Jankowo, Kościelec, Łącko, Ludkowo, Ludwiniec, Mielno, Radłowo, Rybitwy, Rycerzewko, Rycerzewo, Węgierce, Wielowieś and Wojdal.

Neighbouring gminas
Gmina Pakość is bordered by the gminas of Barcin, Dąbrowa, Inowrocław, Janikowo and Złotniki Kujawskie.

References
Polish official population figures 2006

Pakosc
Inowrocław County